Kuara is a village in Katwa II CD block in Katwa subdivision of Purba Bardhaman district in West Bengal, India.

Geography
Kuara is located about 22 km from Katwa.

Demographics
As per the 2011 Census of India Kuara had a total population of 4,885, of which 2,556 (53%) were males and 2,229 (47%) were females. Population below 6 years was 526. The total number of literates in Kuara was 3,129 (72.28% of the population over 6 years).

Education
Three primary schools are situated in Kuara: Dangapara FPA school and Kuara Doltala or Battala FPA School and kuara danga FPA school.

Festivals
The most famous festival in this village is "Baba Dharmaraj Puja". Holi is another festival of Kuara(The gods Krishna and Radha are said to have come to Battala) And Eid also.

Famous places
 Thakur Pukur
 Natun Pukur Par
 Dastir par canal pul
 Kuara Hattala
 Kuara Dastir Par
 Kuara Battala
 Dharmaraj Bari Mandir
 Kalitala
 Khori nodi(River)
 Narchi Bridge
 Pakratala(siting chair)

References

Villages in Purba Bardhaman district